Young Man Mose is the third album by blues/jazz pianist and vocalist Mose Allison which was recorded in 1958 and released on the Prestige label.

Reception

The Allmusic site awarded the album 3 stars.

Track listing 
 "Somebody Else Is Taking My Place" (Bob Ellsworth, Richard Howard, Russ Morgan) - 4:03 
 "Don't Get Around Much Anymore" (Duke Ellington, Bob Russell) - 2:47 
 "Bye Bye Blues" (Fred Hamm, Dave Bennett, Bert Lown, Chauncey Gray) - 3:19 
 "How Long Has This Been Going On?" (George Gershwin, Ira Gershwin) - 4:07 
 "I Told Ya I Loved Ya, Now Get Out" (Lou Carter, Herb Ellis, Johnny Frigo) - 4:42 
 "Baby Let Me Hold Your Hand" (Ray Charles) - 3:15 
 "Stroll" - 3:55 (Mose Allison)
 "I Hadn't Anyone Till You" (Ray Noble) - 2:31 
 "My Kinda Love" (Louis Alter, Jo Trent) - 3:50 
 "Sleepy Time Gal" (Joseph Reed Alden, Raymond B. Egan, Ange Lorenzo, Richard A. Whiting) - 5:23

Personnel 
Mose Allison - piano, trumpet on 6 and 7, vocals
Addison Farmer - bass
Nick Stabulas - drums

References 

Mose Allison albums
1958 albums
Prestige Records albums
Albums produced by Bob Weinstock
Albums recorded at Van Gelder Studio